Teddy Safori Addi (born 26 January 1984) is a Ghanaian politician and member of the National Democratic Congress. He is the member of parliament for the Ayensuano Constituency.

Early life and education 
Addi hails from Coalter. He holds a BSc in Project Management.

References 

Living people
1984 births
National Democratic Congress (Ghana) politicians
Ghanaian MPs 2021–2025